Jack Sydney George "Bud" Cullen,  (April 20, 1927 – July 5, 2005) was a Canadian Federal Court judge and politician.

Early years

Born in Creighton Mine, Ontario, Cullen was given the nickname of Bud by his mother when he was a young boy. Later, he legally changed his name to Bud. Cullen went to Creighton Mine Public School, Lansdowne Public School, and Sudbury High School before attending the University of Toronto and Osgoode Hall Law School.

Law and politics

A lawyer practicing in Sarnia, Ontario, Cullen was first elected to the House of Commons of Canada in the 1968 federal election as the Liberal Member of Parliament for Sarnia.

Key figure in government

In 1971, he became parliamentary secretary to the Minister of National Defence. He subsequently served as parliamentary secretary to the Energy Minister (1972) and to the Finance Minister (1974–1975).

Prime Minister Pierre Trudeau appointed Cullen to the Cabinet as Minister of National Revenue in 1975. Cullen moved to the position of Minister of Manpower and Immigration in 1976, and remained in the position when it was renamed Minister of Employment and Immigration the next year, until the defeat of the Trudeau government in the 1979 election.

Final days in politics and the judgeship

Cullen lost his Sarnia seat in the 1979 election, but regained it in the subsequent 1980 election, but he did not return to Cabinet. Cullen was appointed a judge in the trial division of the Federal Court of Canada by Prime Minister John Turner in July 1984 prior to that year's election, and he remained on the bench until his retirement in August 2000.

Connection to Sarnia Mayor Bradley

Prior to being elected to Sarnia City Council for the first time in the municipal elections of 1985, future Sarnia mayor Mike Bradley got his political feet wet working as an executive assistant for MP Cullen.  Bradley even made a run at winning Cullen's seat in 1984 and has described him in a number of interviews as a political role model of his.

Federal election results

Sarnia

Source: Elections Canada

Source: Elections Canada

Sarnia—Lambton

Source: Elections Canada

Source: Elections Canada

Sarnia

Source: Elections Canada

Archives 
There is a Jack Cullen fonds at Library and Archives Canada.

References

1927 births
2005 deaths
Lawyers in Ontario
Judges in Ontario
Liberal Party of Canada MPs
Members of the House of Commons of Canada from Ontario
Members of the United Church of Canada
Politicians from Greater Sudbury
Members of the King's Privy Council for Canada
University of Toronto alumni